The Phantom of Hollywood is a 1974 American made-for-television horror thriller film and starring Skye Aubrey, Jack Cassidy, Jackie Coogan, Broderick Crawford, Peter Haskell John Ireland and Peter Lawford. It is notable for being one of the last films shot on the Metro-Goldwyn-Mayer back lot, which was being demolished at the time of filming.

The film aired on CBS Television, and was originally titled The Phantom of Lot 2.  A riff on Gaston Leroux's 1910 novel The Phantom of the Opera, it was produced and directed by Gene Levitt.

Plot
Murders taking place on the back lot of Worldwide Studios turn out to be the work of a disfigured actor who has been living there for years and will stop at nothing to cease the sale of the back lot to developers. The film seems to place a lot of emphasis on the chalk outline and one character is even heard to quip, "We're going to be running out of chalk," while standing over a murder scene in a dry pool on the set.

Cast
 Skye Aubrey as Randy Cross
 Jack Cassidy as Otto Vonner / Karl Vonner 
 Jackie Coogan as Jonathan
 Broderick Crawford as Capt. O'Neal 
 Peter Haskell as Ray Burns
 John Ireland as Lt. Gifford
 Peter Lawford as Roger Cross  
 Gary Barton as Duke
 Corinne Calvet as Mrs. Wickes 
 John Lupton as Al 
 Kent Taylor as Wickes 
 Regis Toomey as Joe
 Fredd Wayne as Clyde 
 Bill Williams - Fogel  
 Carl Byrd as Cameraman
 Edward Cross as Clint
 Damon Douglas as Andy
 Bill Stout as Commentator
 Billy Halop as Studio Engineer

Production
The film is produced by MGM with Gene Levitt as its director, William McGarry as assistant director, and Burt Nodella as the executive producer.

See also
 List of American films of 1974

References

External links

 .

1974 films
1974 television films
1970s crime films
1970s mystery films
Films scored by Leonard Rosenman
Films about actors
Films based on The Phantom of the Opera
American mystery films
CBS network films
Films directed by Gene Levitt
1970s American films